Sichuanosuchus is an extinct genus of crocodylomorph from the Late Jurassic and possibly Early Cretaceous of China.

Systematics
 
Poll and Norell (2004) recovered Sichuanosuchus as sister to Shantungosuchus and Zosuchus based on the presence of a ventrally deflected posterior region of the mandibular rami. Buscalioni (2017) recovered Sichuanosuchus as sister to Shantungosuchus, Zosuchus, and Shartegosuchidae, and Dollman et al. (2018) went further by erecting Shartegosuchoidea for the clade formed by Shartegosuchidae, Sichuanosuchus, Zosuchus, and Shantungosuchus.

References

  Chinese Fossil Vertebrates by Spencer G. Lucas

Terrestrial crocodylomorphs
Late Jurassic crocodylomorphs
Early Cretaceous crocodylomorphs of Asia
Cretaceous China
Jurassic China
Mesozoic reptiles of Asia
Prehistoric pseudosuchian genera